Subrata Chowdhury is an Indian cricketer who played first-class cricket for Tripura. He played first-class cricket in the seasons of 1987/88 and 1988/89.

References

Indian cricketers
Tripura cricketers
Living people
1959 births